Variations is the fourth studio album by American country music artist Eddie Rabbitt. It was released in 1978 under the Elektra Records label. The album produced three singles: "Hearts on Fire", which peaked at number two on the country charts, and two country number one hits: "You Don't Love Me Anymore", which also peaked at 18 on Adult Contemporary charts; and "I Just Want to Love You". "Kentucky Rain", a song co-written by the artist and originally recorded by Elvis Presley in 1970, was also included on the album.

Rabbitt's father, Thomas Rabbitt, plays Irish fiddle on "Song of Ireland".

Track listing

Charts

Weekly charts

Year-end charts

Singles

References

1978 albums
Eddie Rabbitt albums
Albums produced by David Malloy
Elektra Records albums